Sunil Handunnetti (born October 19, 1970) is a Sri Lankan politician and a member of the Parliament of Sri Lanka. He contested the 2010 parliamentary elections under the Democratic National Alliance (DNA), which is led by former army chief Sarath Fonseka and was re-elected to Parliament from Colombo District.

Entered politics by being a student in Sri Jayawardanapura University and became the Convener of the Inter University Students' Federation in 1995 and continued until 1996. Was an activity in the Socialist Students Union. 
Entered full-time politics in 1998 and was elected as a councilor of Colombo Municipal Council during 1998-1999
Was elected to the Central Committee of the JVP in 2000 and was appointed to the Political Bureau of the JVP in 2012 and was appointed as the Financial Secretary of the JVP.
Elected to Parliament at the general election held in 2004 with the second highest number of preferential votes from Colombo District. In 2004 was appointed as the Deputy Minister of Ministry of Rural Economic Affairs.

References
 

Living people
Sri Lankan Buddhists
Janatha Vimukthi Peramuna politicians
United People's Freedom Alliance politicians
Members of the 12th Parliament of Sri Lanka
Members of the 13th Parliament of Sri Lanka
Members of the 14th Parliament of Sri Lanka
1971 births
Alumni of Dharmasoka College